The Robur LO 1800 A is a lightweight off-road lorry, made by East German manufacturer VEB Robur-Werke Zittau from 1960 to 1967, alongside the on-road model LO 2500. The LO 1800 A is a forward control lorry, and has rear-wheel drive with switchable front-wheel drive. Its name is an abbreviation for Luftgekühlter Ottomotor, 1800 kg, Allrad (air-cooled otto engine, 1800 kg payload, all-wheel-drive). Powered by a 3.35 L, carburetted, Robur LO 4 engine, rated  at 2800 min−1, and mated to a five-speed gearbox, the LO 1800 A can reach a top speed of 82 km/h.

References

External links

Robur trucks
IFA vehicles
Vehicles introduced in 1960